Deception Glacier is a glacier between the Warren Range and the Boomerang Range, flowing south into upper Mulock Glacier. It was so named by the New Zealand party of the Commonwealth Trans-Antarctic Expedition (1956–58) because it appears to lead directly into Skelton Neve but instead drains southward.

See also
 List of glaciers in the Antarctic
 Glaciology

References

Glaciers of Oates Land